Giuseppe Antonio Sala (27 October 1762 – 23 June 1839) was an Italian cardinal of the Catholic Church who served in numerous high-profile positions in the Roman Curia.

Early life 
Giuseppe Antonio Sala was born on 27 October 1762 in Rome to Giuseppe Antonio Maria Sala and Ana Sacchetti; he had six siblings. He was educated in philosophy at the Pontifical Gregorian University and in theology at the Dominican faculty at the Santa Maria Sopra Minerva, where he received a doctorate in theology in 1761.

Sala was the Secretary to the papal legation to France from 1801 to 1804, and was involved in the negotiations between the Holy See and the post-Revolutionary French Republic that resulted in the Concordat of 1801. He was also Secretary to the papal legation established by Pope Pius VII in 1809 during his exile from Rome. He was appointed the Secretary of the Sacred Congregation for Extraordinary Ecclesiastical Affairs and of the Reform in 1814, as the Secretary of the Sacred Congregation of Rites and the Tridentine Council in December 1825.

Cardinal 
Sala was created a cardinal by Pope Gregory XVI in the consistory on September 30, 1831, and was given the titular church of Santa Maria della Pace on February 24, 1832. On March 21, 1834, he was appointed Prefect of the Sacred Congregation for the Index, and on November 21, 1834, he was named Prefect of the Sacred Congregation for Bishops and Regulars. He was named the archpriest of Santa Maria Maggiore on 11 December 1838. Sala died on 23 June 1839 in Rome, and was interred in the church of Santa Maria della Pace.

See also 

 Cardinals created by Gregory XVI

References 

1762 births
1839 deaths
Italian Roman Catholics
19th-century Italian cardinals
Cardinals created by Pope Gregory XVI